Tibbitt Lake is a lake in the Canadian Northwest Territories.

In winter, an ice road known as the Tibbitt to Contwoyto Winter Road extends from the end of the Ingraham Trail to Contwoyto Lake in Nunavut, forming the latter territory's only road access to the rest of Canada. The lake is named after John Francis Tibbitt, a field geologist who mapped the Yellowknife area with the Geological Survey of Canada in 1935.

Lakes of the Northwest Territories